Air Force Knowledge Now (AFKN) is a web-based collaborative environment developed by Triune Group for the U.S. Air Force (USAF).  From 1999 to 2012, AFKN grew to more than 19,000 Communities of Practice (CoPs) and 400,000 members.  In 2004, Air Force CIO John M. Gilligan designated AFKN the Air Force Center of Excellence for Knowledge Management, making it the USAF’s only certified and accredited enterprise-wide knowledge management program.  By focusing on social, behavioral and cultural aspects of knowledge sharing, AFKN evolved beyond traditional knowledge management systems, which focused on capturing information through technology.

Triune Group has been the prime contractor for the AFKN program since 2004.  The USAF extended the AFKN contract through 2015

Guiding principles

 Decentralized approach – let your users lead
 Ease of use – make it easy and users will come
 Strong support structure – a human touch is critical
 Reach – access must be anytime anywhere
 Validation – users need to trust the system
 Rewards – recognition sweetens the deal
 Word-of-mouth cultural shift – users will advertise for you

Focus areas

The program has two focus areas:

 Collaboration Suite:  Provides management and maintenance of the Air Force Knowledge Now application; a web-based platform providing knowledge sharing and collaboration through virtual workspaces (called Communities of Practice) offering Web 2.0 functionality.  The AFKN approach has always been technology agnostic and the program has embraced new technologies as they have become available.
 Knowledge Management Services:  Provides consulting services throughout the Air Force to help organizations design and implement knowledge centric solutions, typically on the Air Force Knowledge Now application.  These solutions include a KM Maturity Model, Knowledge Retention and Transfer (KR&T) process, and Knowledge Management Workshops (Taxonomy Development, Implementation, Governance, etc.).

Collaboration suite

Adopting a Communities of Practice (CoPs) architecture, AFKN promotes commitment to working together by building a collective knowledge base around a common vital interest.  By going beyond explicit knowledge, which is usually limited to some type of stored information, it reflects the social, behavioral and cultural aspects of knowledge sharing.   By focusing on tacit knowledge ("know-how"), true organizational learning occurs, thus creating a more agile and adaptive Air Force.

This web-based collaborative environment allows members of a CoP to use shared information and communications tools to conduct business, manage projects, keep abreast of important group issues, and solve group problems.  The capabilities of the AFKN system include:

Knowledge-management services

Capabilities that support AFKN are:

 Comprehensive workshops
 Online virtual collaboration and sharing
 Robust Document Management
 Expertise Locators
 Integrated E-learning
 Search/Discovery (powered by Vivisimo Velocity, starting in 2009)
 Shared Network Folders
 Threaded  Discussion Forums
 Validated practices library

See also

 Knowledge management
 Communities of Practice (CoPs)
 Explicit knowledge
 Tacit knowledge
 Organizational learning

References

 Adkins, Randy. "Airmen Tap Into Knowledge Now." AFCEA Signal Connections. 15 May 2008
 Brook, Doug. "Triune Software’s Air Force Knowledge Now" Solution wins 2006 Knowledge Management Award". 2006. 19 Nov. 2007
 Turnipseed, Cathy. "Transformation-U.S. Department of Defense." Air Force Center Improves Access to Knowledge. 2005. 19 Nov. 2007.
 Morrow, Jim. "Air Force Link". Tons of Knowledge Resides in Air Force Web Site. 2003. 19 Nov. 2007
 Lesser, Eric L. (2000). Knowledge and Communities. Massachusetts: Butterworth-Heinemann. .
 English & Baker. (2006) Winning the Knowledge Transfer Race. New York: McGraw-Hill.  .
 Davenport, Rex. “Does Knowledge Management Still Matter?” Training and Development  Feb. 2005: 18–25.
 Myers, Paul S. (1996). Knowledge Management and Organizational Design. Massachusetts: Butterworth-Heinemann. 
 Air Force Knowledge Now (AFKN) Team (2007). Knowledge Centric Operations. Dayton: Triune Group. 1–23
 Davenport & Prusak. (2000). Working Knowledge. Massachusetts: Harvard Business School Press; 2Rev Ed edition

Further reading
 Collison, C. & Parcell, G. (2004). Learning to Fly: Practical Knowledge Management from Leading and Learning Organizations. Chichester, West Sussex: Capstone Publishing. 
 Wenger, Etienne. (2002). Communities of Practice: Learning, Meaning, and Identity. Cambridge, UK; New York, NY: Cambridge University Press. 
 Wenger, Etienne. (2002). Cultivating Communities of Practice. Boston: Harvard Business School Press. 

United States Air Force